The Blue Veiled (Rusari Abi) is a 1995 Iranian Romance-drama film written and directed by Rakhshān Banietemad.

Plot 
Rasoul Rahmani (Ezzatolah Entezami) owns a tomato farm and he has a factory next to it. He, who lost his wife a few years ago, lives alone. Nobar Kurdani (Fatemeh Motamed-Arya) is a woman who takes care of her family and has to work. She is selected along with several other women to work on the farm and…

Cast 
 Ezzatolah Entezami
 Fatemeh Motamed-Arya
 Golab Adineh
 Afsar Asadi
 Baran Kosari
 Behnaz Jafari
 Reza Fayazi
 Farhad Aslani
 Nematollah Gorji
 Faghiheh Soltani
 Jamshid Esmailkhani
 Nadia Golchin
 Nayereh Farahani
 Mehri Mehrnia
 Abbas Mohebbi
 Mohsen Bonakdar

References

External links

1995 films
1990s Persian-language films
Iranian drama films